Phyllophaga fervida is a species of scarab beetle in the family Scarabaeidae. It is found in the Caribbean Sea and North America.

References

Further reading

 

Melolonthinae
Articles created by Qbugbot
Beetles described in 1775
Taxa named by Johan Christian Fabricius